Arvid Kubbel (12 September 1889 – 11 January 1938) was a chess player and composer of chess problems and endgame studies from the Soviet Union. He was a brother of Evgeny and Leonid Kubbel; their father was born in Latvia, of Baltic German descent. He played in relatively few tournaments, but was among the stronger players of the early Soviet Union.

Chess tournaments
In Moscow in 1920, he tied for fifth through seventh place at the first Soviet Chess Championship, won by Alexander Alekhine. At the second Soviet Championship in Petrograd 1923, he took sixth place behind Peter Romanovsky. He took fifth place at the Leningrad City Chess Championship in 1924 (won by Grigory Levenfish), tied for 11-13th at the fourth Soviet championship at Leningrad 1925 (won by Efim Bogoljubow), and tied for eighth and ninth place at the 1928 Leningrad City championship (won by Ilya Rabinovich).

Arrest and execution
On 21 November 1937 he was arrested and charged under Article 58 1a (treason) of the RSFSR penal code. According to Huffington Post chess columnist Lubomir Kavalek, this was for sending his compositions to foreign newspapers.  He was executed shortly afterwards.

References

External links
Arvid Kubbel at 365Chess.com

1889 births
1938 deaths
Baltic-German people
Soviet chess players
Chess composers
Great Purge victims from Russia
Sportspeople from Saint Petersburg